Anegundi previously called Kishkindha is a village in the Gangavathi taluk, Koppal district in the Indian state of Karnataka, It is older than Hampi, situated on the northern bank of the Tungabhadra River. Huchappayana matha temple (with black-stone pillars and dance sculptures), Pampa Sarovar, Aramane (a ruined palace), Ranganatha temple, Kamal Mahal, and Nava Brindavana are the major attractions. Nimvapuram, a nearby village, has a mount of ash believed to be the cremated remains of monkey king Vaali.
Anegundi is best visited along with Hampi, it is part of the world Heritage Site, Hampi, being developed into a world class tourism spot by engaging the locals to sensitise them to their cultural wealth and provide them a means of livelihood. Existing tanks in the village have been redesigned to store clean drinking water and proper drainage facilities developed to keep the surroundings clean and hygienic. The Kishkinda Trust is working on tourism development in Anegundi.

History

Anegundi, believed to be the monkey kingdom of Kishkindha (Kishkinta means in local language a forest where the monkeys lived) in the epic of Ramayana, is at a distance of 5 km from the historical site of Hampi. Anjanadri hill, the birthplace of monkey-god Hanuman, and the mountain Rishimuka are the other places near Anegundi associated with Ramayana. It is said to have one of the oldest plateaus on the planet, estimated to be 3,000 million years old. So, only local story-tellers refer to Anegundi as the maternal home of Bhoodevi (Mother Earth).

The village, located on the northern side bank of River Tungabhadra, was said to be the legendary Kishkindha, a kingdom of the monkey Prince Sugriva and the cradle place of the historic Krishnadevaraya dynasty of the glorious Vijayanagar empire and falls in the core zone of Hampi.

History

Pre-historic

Neolithic history is represented in this region by Mourya Mane, a several-thousand-year-old Stone Age Colony. Several Neolithic dwellings still bear paintings that are clear and intact even to this day, at 'Onke Kindi'. This is the rare human settlement where we will find traces of Microlithic, Megalithic and Neolithic age of human life at one same spot. Anegundi area is older than the Vijayanagar empire, and is also older than planet. As per geologists the Anegundi area is about four billion years old. Till date, this village is a living heritage site in its true sense. The nearest Pre-historic sites are HireBenekal, Chikkarampur, Mallapur, Venkatapur and Anjanahalli.
Pre-historic rock shelters and paintings are found in Tungabhadra river valley.

Anegundi mutt
At anegundi there is religious monastery called saraswati peetam established by Kalahasthacharya. The mutt follows Advaitha sampradaya of shankaracharya. This is the guru peetam of vishwakarma present pontiff is shri shri kalahastendra saraswathi swamiji. The mutt has its main branch at anegundi, padukuthyar of udupi district.

Rock art
At Anegundi there is prehistoric settlement called Onake Kindi. The boulders with rock art, a rock with some red and white markings had figures of human and bull. on another boulder there is a circular diagram like sun and moon and with some symbolism. Actually the rock painting are belonged to Iron Age, date back to 1500 BC and the faded circular painting a very rare depiction of a megalithic style of burial, also includes a human body in the middle surrounded by a stone circle and burial goods. The site of megalithic dolmens located up in the hills locals call it as Mourya Mane (morya means short in local language), about five to seven feet high sheet rocks forms four walls and another rock sheet used as roof (Neolithic period), it is about 10 km away from Anegundi, the Neolithic dwellings in the Elu gudda hill range, from Benegal to Indaragi gudda. About 1.5 km from Anegundi, there are rock shelters and paintings, paintings found in the hill ranges called locally as Elu gudda Salu.

Ancient kingdom
Anegundi the ancient town Kishkindha of Ramayana, a lively settlement has mahals and monuments (Gagan Mahal), there are forts and palaces, ruined temples, lush green padi fields.

Ramayana connection
Pampa Sarovar related to Shiva and Parvati featured in Ramayana, Sabari a devotee of Rama met here, the legends of Ramayana including Hanuman, Sugriva all are pervading around Anegundi. The pilgrims consider Pampa Sarovara a holy place.

Pre Vijayanagara period
Anegundi in Kannada means Elephant Gorge, it is older than Hampi, in fact the mother kingdom (cradle city of Vijayanagara). Anegundi history dates back to 3rd BC century was under Ashoka Empire. 
Anegundi was ruled by various dynasties like Shatavahanas, Kadambas, Chalukyas, Rashtrakutas, Delhi Sultanate, Vijayanagara Empire and Bahamanis. Now this place is well-known tourism place.

Vijayanagara period
Early 14th century, elephant enclosure in Kannada known as Anegundi, named because of elephant contingent of Vijayanagar army. The first capital of Vijayanagar Empire and capital of several other dynasties. In 1334, Deva Raya the Chief Minister of Anegundi became ruler of Anegundi. When Delhi Sultans invaded Warangal, Harihara and Bukka escaped and came to Anegundi, later founded the Vijayanagar Empire at Hampi. The Tallarighatta gate (Talwar Ghatta) (erstwhile toll gate) is the entrance to Anegundi from Hampi side, the collapsed modern day bridge under construction between Hampi and Anegundi across the Tungabhadra river. Crossing the river in a coracle (boat) which is circular basket shaped made of cane, bamboo and wrapped in a plastic sheet. "Coracle was used to ferry people in the Vijayanagar time also", it is mentioned by Dominoes Paes the Portuguese traveller in the 16th century, there is mention of carrying "about twenty persons and horses and oxen to cross the river."

During 16th, 17th and 18th centuries, Anegundi was ruled by Bijapur Sultans, Moghuls, Marathas and Tipu Sultan. According to 1824 treaty with the British and Hyderabad Nizam, the king of Vijayanagar who was ruled from Hampi lost his kingdom, provided a monthly pension of Rs 300, forced to leave Hampi and make Anegundi as official residence, Rani Lalkumari Bai last descendant who received monthly pension.

Anegundi Fort
Anegundi has a Fort with many gates; there is a Durga temple and the Fort entrance, there are also tombs laying scattered around. There is a Ganesha cave temple. Vijayanagar kings used to pray before every battle at the Durga temple, then they used to visit Pampa Sarovar and Shri Lakshmi temple. Royal descendants of Vijayanagar Empire are still exist in Anegundi.

Gallery

See also
.

References

External links

 The Hindu - Royal ruins, smoking sadhus
 Anegundi
 Of time present and time past...
 Guidelines for developing Anegundi

Villages in Koppal district
Forts in Karnataka
Archaeological sites in Karnataka
Neolithic
Burial monuments and structures
Megalithic monuments in India
Archaeology of death
Anegundi
Prehistoric art in India
Rock shelters
Vijayanagara Empire
Hindu temples in Koppal district
Former capital cities in India
Ghost towns in Asia
Tourist attractions in Karnataka